The men's 10,000 metres event at the 1981 Summer Universiade was held at the Stadionul Naţional in Bucharest on 21 July 1981.
 The times are unofficial as, due to the officials' error, the athletes ran one extra lap, making the race 10,400 metres in total.

Results

References

Athletics at the 1981 Summer Universiade
1981